During the 1960–61 English football season, Newcastle United F.C. competed in the Football League First Division.

Season summary
In the 1960–61 season, Newcastle were relegated after 13 years in the top flight after a season which saw the Magpies score an impressive 86 goals, but conceded a horrific 109 goals.

Final league table

P = Matches played; W = Matches won; D = Matches drawn; L = Matches lost; F = Goals for; A = Goals against; GA = Goal average; GD = Goal difference; Pts = Points

Results
Newcastle United's score comes first

Legend

Football League First Division

FA Cup

League Cup

Squad

References

Newcastle United F.C. seasons
Newcastle United